Events in the year 1887 in Germany.

Incumbents

National level
 Kaiser – William I
 Chancellor – Otto von Bismarck

State level

Kingdoms
 King of Bavaria – Otto of Bavaria
 King of Prussia – Kaiser William I
 King of Saxony – Albert of Saxony
 King of Württemberg – Charles I of Württemberg

Grand Duchies
 Grand Duke of Baden – Frederick I
 Grand Duke of Hesse – Louis IV
 Grand Duke of Mecklenburg-Schwerin – Frederick Francis II
 Grand Duke of Mecklenburg-Strelitz – Frederick William
 Grand Duke of Oldenburg – Peter II
 Grand Duke of Saxe-Weimar-Eisenach – Charles Alexander

Principalities
 Schaumburg-Lippe – Adolf I, Prince of Schaumburg-Lippe
 Schwarzburg-Rudolstadt – George Albert, Prince of Schwarzburg-Rudolstadt
 Schwarzburg-Sondershausen – Charles Gonthier, Prince of Schwarzburg-Sondershausen
 Principality of Lippe – Woldemar, Prince of Lippe
 Reuss Elder Line – Heinrich XXII, Prince Reuss of Greiz
 Reuss Younger Line – Heinrich XIV, Prince Reuss Younger Line
 Waldeck and Pyrmont – George Victor, Prince of Waldeck and Pyrmont

Duchies
 Duke of Anhalt – Frederick I, Duke of Anhalt
 Duke of Brunswick – Prince Albert of Prussia (regent)
 Duke of Saxe-Altenburg – Ernst I, Duke of Saxe-Altenburg
 Duke of Saxe-Coburg and Gotha – Ernst II, Duke of Saxe-Coburg and Gotha
 Duke of Saxe-Meiningen – Georg II, Duke of Saxe-Meiningen

Colonial Governors
 Cameroon (Kamerun) – Julius Freiherr von Soden (1st term) to 13 May, then Jesko von Puttkamer (1st term) to 4 October, then Eugen von Zimmerer (1st term)
 German East Africa (Deutsch-Ostafrika) – Karl Peters (administrator)
 German New Guinea (Deutsch-Neuguinea) – Gustav von Oertzen (commissioner) to January; also Georg Freiherr von Schleinitz (Landeshauptleute of the German New Guinea Company)
 German South-West Africa (Deutsch-Südwestafrika) – Heinrich Ernst Göring (acting commissioner)
 Togoland – Ernst Falkenthal (commissioner) to May, then from July Jesko von Puttkamer (acting commissioner) (1st term)
 Wituland (Deutsch-Witu) – Gustav Denhardt (resident)

Events
 21 February – German federal election, 1887
 18 June – Reinsurance Treaty in Berlin
 29 September – Footballclub Hamburger SV was founded.

Undated
 The Petri dish is created by German bacteriologist Julius Richard Petri.
 Heinrich Hertz discovers the photoelectric effect on the production and reception of electromagnetic waves in radio, an important step towards the understanding of the quantum nature of light.
 Adolf Gaston Eugen Fick invents the contact lens, made of a type of brown glass.
 Physikalisch-Technische Reichsanstalt is founded.
 Friedrich Loeffler creates Löffler's serum, a coagulated blood serum used for the detection of the bacteria.

Births

 1 January – Wilhelm Canaris, German Imperial admiral and head of the German Abwehr (died 1945)
 3 January – August Macke, German painter (died 1914)
 7 January – Thomas Wimmer, German politician (died 1964)
 29 January – Prince August Wilhelm of Prussia, German nobleman (died 1949)
 6 February – Josef Frings, German cardinal of Roman Catholic Church (died 1978)
 8 February – Heinrich Spoerl, German author (died 1955)
 20 March – Walther Kittel, Wehrmacht general (died 1971) in Metz, modern-day France
 21 March – Erich Mendelsohn, German architect (died 1953)
 2 April – Louise Schroeder, German politician (died 1957)
 19 April – Wolrad, Prince of Schaumburg-Lippe, German nobleman (died 1962)
 2 June – Gottlieb Hering, Nazi concentration camp commandant (died in 1945)
 13 June – Bruno Frank, German author, poet, dramatist and humanist (died 1945)
 20 June – Kurt Schwitters, German artist (died 1958)
 23 June – Ernst Rowohlt, German publisher (died 1960)
 22 July – Gustav Ludwig Hertz, physicist, Nobel Prize laureate (died 1975)
 25 July – Carl Freiherr von Langen, German equestrian (died 1934)
 8 August – Gertrud Morgner, German politician (died 1978)
 9 August – Hans Oster, German general in the Wehrmacht of Nazi Germany who was also a leading figure of the German resistance (died 1945)
 22 August – Lutz Graf Schwerin von Krosigk, German politician (died 1977)
 3 September – Max Brauer, German politician (died 1973)
 22 September – Hans Schlossberger, German physician (died 1960)
 23 September – Wilhelm Hoegner, German politician (died 1980)
 10 November – Hans Ehard, German politician (died 1980)
 24 November – Erich von Manstein, German commander of the Wehrmacht,(died 1973)
 6 December – Heinrich von Vietinghoff, German general (died 1952)
 28 December – Walter Ruttmann, German director (died 1941)

Deaths

 17 July – Walther Otto Müller, German botanist (born 1833)
 14 August – Adolf Pansch, German anatomist (born 1841)
 29 September – Bernhard von Langenbeck, German surgeon (born 1819)
 17 October – Gustav Kirchhoff, German physicist (born 1824)

References

 
Years of the 19th century in Germany
Germany
Germany